Kylie Roy Fitts (born October 11, 1994) is a former American football linebacker who played in the National Football League (NFL) for 4 seasons. He played college football at Utah. He was drafted by the Chicago Bears in the sixth round of the 2018 NFL Draft and spent his last three seasons with the Arizona Cardinals.

High school and college career 
Fitts attended Redlands East Valley High School in Redlands, California, where he was a 4 star recruit. Fitts originally signed with UCLA, but transferred to Utah after one year with the program. After redshirting for a year, Fitts played in all 13 games during his sophomore year. Fitts injured his foot during the second game of his junior year against BYU, and was declared out for the year. Fitts continued to deal with injuries during his senior year, but recorded 3 sacks and 23 tackles during his senior year. He was also invited to the 2018 Senior Bowl.

Professional career

Chicago Bears
Fitts was drafted by the Chicago Bears in the sixth round (181st overall) in the 2018 NFL Draft. He was released on August 31, 2019.

Arizona Cardinals
On September 3, 2019, Fitts was signed to the Arizona Cardinals practice squad. He was promoted to the active roster on December 4, 2019. On December 28, 2020, Fitts was placed on injured reserve.

The Cardinals placed an exclusive-rights free agent tender on Fitts on March 15, 2021. He signed the one-year contract on April 15. He was waived on August 31, 2021 and re-signed to the practice squad the next day. He was promoted to the active roster on September 11, 2021. He was placed on injured reserve on October 22, 2021. He became an unrestricted free agent in 2022.

Retirement 
On April 15, 2022, Fitts announced his retirement from professional football citing multiple concussions as the main reason.

References

External links 
 Chicago Bears bio
 Utah Utes bio
 

1994 births
Living people
American football defensive ends
Chicago Bears players
Players of American football from California
Sportspeople from San Bernardino, California
UCLA Bruins football players
Utah Utes football players
American football linebackers
Arizona Cardinals players